Cloudy Cloud Calculator is the third studio album by Japanese musician Takako Minekawa. It was released on December 10, 1997 by Polystar. The album was released in the United States on November 17, 1998 by Emperor Norton Records. Minekawa played almost every instrument on the album and wrote, produced and arranged nearly all its songs.

Minekawa toured in the United States to support the album. The EP Ximer... C.C.C. Remix, released on September 23, 1998 by Polystar, features remixes of tracks from Cloudy Cloud Calculator by various artists.

Critical reception

Heather Phares of AllMusic described Cloudy Cloud Calculator as one of Minekawa's "finest and most unusual moments" and "highly inventive, restrained pop". Christian Bruno, writing in Metro, referred to the album's songs as "wonderfully cute, all-synthesizer musings".

Track listing

Personnel
Credits are adapted from the album's liner notes.

Musicians
 Takako Minekawa – vocals, acoustic guitar, bass, drums, electric guitar, electronic drums (Yamaha DD-7, E-mu SP-1200), güiro, recorder, synthesizer (Boss SYB-3, Casio SA-1, Casio VA-10, Minimoog Voyager, Moog Prodigy, Roland CR-5000, Six-Trak), vocoder, arrangement
 Yuko Aiso – violin
 Yumiko Ohno – bass, maracas, synthesizer (Minimoog), theremin
 Atsushi Tsuyama – drums
 Mooog Yamamoto – turntables, "bird call"
 Seiichi Yamamoto – acoustic guitar, electric bass, electric guitar, electronic drums, synthesizer (Roland JP-8000), arrangement
 Masaaki Yoshida – synthesizer
 Sugar Yoshinaga – arrangement

Production
 Takako Minekawa – production
 Tetsuya Kotani – engineering
 Masao Nakazato – mastering
 Seiichi Yamamoto – mixing, production
 Sugar Yoshinaga – production

Design
 Sheila Sachs – design
 Chikashi Suzuki – photography
 Mariko Yamamoto – art direction, design
 Mooog Yamamoto – art direction, design

References

External links
 

1997 albums
Takako Minekawa albums
Emperor Norton Records albums